Deer Island or Inishmore (derived from the Irish Inis Mór meaning 'the great island') is located in County Clare, Ireland.

Location
According to Clare County Library, Deer Island, or Innismore, is situated near the western bank of the River Fergus about a quarter of a mile from the village of Ballynacally. In 1837 it was measured at 493 statute acres.

Population
Administratively it is part of the District Electoral Division of Ballynacally. Population in 1996 was 1 (unchanged since 1991). It was the only inhabited island in Co. Clare. The 1901 census showed 9 families living on the island.
It has been uninhabited since 2004, when the last of the residents died, though many families of former residents visit the island throughout the year.

Demographics 
The table below reports data on Inishmore's population taken from Discover the Islands of Ireland (Alex Ritsema, Collins Press, 1999) and the Census of Ireland. Census data in Ireland before 1841 are not considered complete and/or reliable.

History and archaeology
In 1837 the island was nearly equally divided between pasture and tillage. It was the property of the Earl of Egremont and was also called Inchmore, or the "Great Island", being the largest of the Fergus islands. Samuel Lewis reported that "Flax was formerly cultivated here… but is now only partially grown". He also mentioned "some vestiges of an abbey still remaining, founded… at a very early period, by Saint Senan of Inniscattery, who appointed St. Liberius one of his disciples, to preside over it". The ruins of the old church, some cholera graves and a holy well called Tobar Breedia are still to be seen. Deer Island was once a deer park, enclosed by water, where the Earl of Thomond kept a live larder of venison.

Nearby islands
Nearby islands include:
Canon Island, anciently called Elanogannonoch, contains remains of a priory founded and built between the years 1166 and 1169 by Donald O'Brien, king of Limerick
Inishdadroum ('the island of the two backs'), of two ancient churches, in one of which St. Brendan of Kerry ministered
Low Island on which is one of those cairns called 'Dhiarmuid and Graunia's bed,' remarkable in bardic tradition and folk-lore. The Celtic legend is, that Dhiarmunid, a young chieftain, fled with Graunia, the affianced wife of the aged Fionn mac Cumhaill, who were pursued by Finn and his warriors, sleeping each night in a different place under a stone structure hastily erected by Dhiarmuid.

External links
http://www.clarelibrary.ie/eolas/coclare/genealogy/directories/guys1893/intro.htm
http://www.clarelibrary.ie/eolas/coclare/places/deer_island1.htm
https://web.archive.org/web/20060523075458/http://www.btinternet.com/~franco.ferrero/Oileain.htm
http://www.limerickcorp.ie/applications/general/museum_details.aspx?RowID=24537

Further reading
Census 96, Vol. 1, Population Classified by Area (Dublin 1997).

Islands of County Clare
Uninhabited islands of Ireland
River islands of Ireland